Álvaro is a Spanish, Galician and Portuguese male given name and surname (see Spanish naming customs) of Visigothic origin. Some claim it may be related to the Old Norse name Alfarr, formed of the elements alf "elf" and arr "warrior", but the absence of Visigothic names containing the particle "alf" or "elf" evident in Kremer's Onomastik suggests that it may come from other forms, like "all" and maybe "ward".

Given name

Artists
Alvaro (DJ), a DJ
Álvaro Díaz González (born 1972), Chilean screenwriter, producer and director
Álvaro Guerrero, Mexican film actor
Álvaro Guevara, Chilean painter
Álvaro López, British drummer
Álvaro Morte, Spanish film actor
Álvaro Mutis, Colombian poet, novelist, and essayist
Álvaro Pierri, Uruguayan classical guitarist
Álvaro Soler, Spanish singer and songwriter
Álvaro Torres, Salvadoran singer and songwriter

Politicians and statesmen
Álvaro Alsogaray (1913 - 2005), Argentine liberal politician.
Álvaro Arzú (1946–2018), President of Guatemala from 1996 to 2000
Álvaro Antonio, Filipino politician
Álvaro Araújo Castro, Colombian politician
Álvaro Caminha, Portuguese Captain-major of São Tomé and Príncipe
Álvaro de Castro, Prime Minister of Portugal in the 1920s
Álvaro Colom (1951–2023), President of Guatemala
Álvaro Cunhal (1913–2005), Portuguese communist politician
Álvaro de Figueroa, 1st Count of Romanones (1863–1950), three times Prime Minister of Spain between 1912 and 1918
Alvaro de Loyola Furtado (died 1981), Indian politician
Álvaro Delgado (born 1969), Uruguayan veterinarian and politician
Álvaro García Linera (born 1962), Bolivian politician
Álvaro Gutiérrez (politician), Peruvian politician
Álvaro de Luna ((between 1388 and 1390–1453), Spanish Constable of Castile
Álvaro Noboa (born 1950), Ecuadorian businessman and politician
Álvaro Obregón (1880–1928), Mexican general and President of Mexico from 1920 to 1924
Álvaro Uribe Vélez (born 1952), President of Colombia from 2002 to 2010

Nobility
Álvaro I of Kongo, King of Kongo from 1568 to 1587
Álvaro II of Kongo, King of Kongo from 1587 to 1614
Álvaro III of Kongo, King of Kongo from 1615 to 1622
Álvaro IV of Kongo, King of Kongo from 1631 to 1636
Álvaro V of Kongo, King of Kongo in 1636
Álvaro VI of Kongo, King of Kongo from 1636 to 1641
Álvaro VII of Kongo, King of Kongo from 1665 to 1666
Álvaro VIII of Kongo, King of Kongo from 1666 to 1669
Álvaro IX of Kongo, King of Kongo from 1669 to 1670
Álvaro X of Kibangu, King of Kongo from 1688 to 1695
Álvaro XI of Kongo, King of Kongo from 1764 to 1778
Álvaro XIV of Kongo, King of Kongo from 1891 to 1896
Álvaro Núñez de Lara (died 1218) (c. 1170–1218), Castilian nobleman
Álvaro, Count of Urgell (1239–1268), also Viscount of Àger
Álvaro Núñez de Lara (died 1287) ((c. 1261–1287), Castilian nobleman
Álvaro Vaz de Almada, 1st Count of Avranches (c. 1390–1449), Portuguese nobleman
Álvaro of Braganza (c. 1440–1504), Portuguese nobleman
Álvaro de Bazán, 1st Marquess of Santa Cruz (1526–1588), Spanish admiral
Álvaro de Bazán, 2nd Marquess of Santa Cruz (1571-1646)
Álvaro of Lencastre, 3rd Duke of Aveiro (1540–1626), Portuguese nobleman
Infante Alvaro, Duke of Galliera (1910–1997), Spanish Infante

Sports
Alvaro (footballer), Brazilian footballer, full name Alvaro Luis Tavares Vieira
Álvaro Arbeloa, Spanish football player with the Spanish NT and Real Madrid CF
Álvaro Bautista, Spanish Grand Prix motorcycle road racer
Álvaro Cervera, Spanish football player and coach
Álvaro Espinoza, Venezuelan baseball player
Álvaro Gestido, Uruguayan football player
Álvaro González (footballer, born 1990), Spanish football player with Marseille
Álvaro Lozano, Colombian road cyclist
Álvaro Luiz Maior de Aquino, Brazilian football player
Álvaro Magalhães, Portuguese football player
Álvaro Martínez Beltrán, Spanish football player
Álvaro Medrán, Spanish football player
Álvaro Mejía (athlete), Colombian long distance runner
Álvaro Mejía (cyclist), Colombian cyclist
Álvaro Mejía Pérez, Spanish football player
Álvaro Mesén, Costa Rican football player
Álvaro Morata, Spanish football player
Álvaro Navarro Serra, Spanish Valencian pilota player
Álvaro Negredo, Spanish football player
Álvaro Novo, Spanish football player
Álvaro Odriozola, Spanish football player
Álvaro Parente, Portuguese racecar driver
Álvaro Pino, Spanish road racing cyclist
Álvaro Quirós, Spanish professional golfer
Álvaro Recoba, Uruguayan football player
Álvaro Ricaldi, Bolivian football player
Álvaro Saborío, Costa Rican football player
Álvaro Salvadores, Chilean basketball player
Álvaro Santos, Brazilian football player
Álvaro Sierra, Colombian road cyclist
Álvaro Tejero, Spanish football player
Álvaro Velasco (weightlifter) (born 1971), Colombian weightlifter
Álvaro Velasco (golfer) (born 1981), Spanish professional golfer
Álvaro Zamith, first president of the Brazilian Football Confederation

Other
Álvaro Coutinho Aguirre (1899–1987), Brazilian agronomist, zoologist and naturalist
Álvaro del Portillo, Spanish engineer and Roman Catholic bishop
Álvaro Saieh, Chilean businessman
Álvaro Siza Vieira, Portuguese architect
 Alvaro Luna Hernandez (born 1952), American activist

Surname
Alexander Nuno Alvaro, German politician
Anne Alvaro (born 1951), French actress
Pedro Álvaro (born 2000), Portuguese footballer

See also
 Alf
 Álvaro de Bazán-class frigate, class of frigates in Spanish Navy
 Álvaro García (disambiguation)
 Álvarez (surname)
 Alvar (disambiguation)
 Alvaro Cove, in Antarctica

Spanish-language surnames